The 1978–79 Iowa Hawkeyes men's basketball team represented the University of Iowa in the 1978–79 college basketball season. The team was led by head coach Lute Olson and played their home games at the Iowa Field House. They finished the season with a 20–8 record and, with a 13-5 conference record, earned a Big Ten Championship (three-way tie with Michigan State and Purdue). To date, this is the last regular-season conference title for the Hawkeyes men's basketball team.

Roster

Schedule

Rankings

Awards and honors 
 Ronnie Lester – Second-Team AP All-American, Third-Team UPI and NABC All-American
 Kevin Boyle – Big Ten Freshman of the Year

References 

Iowa
Iowa Hawkeyes men's basketball seasons
Hawkeyes
Hawkeyes
Iowa